Local elections were held in the Province of Laguna on May 14, 2007 as part of the 2007 Philippine general election. Voters selected candidates for all local positions: a municipal/city mayor, vice mayor and town councilors, as well as members of the Sangguniang Panlalawigan, the vice-governor, governor and representatives for the four districts of Laguna.

Candidates

Administration's Team

Opposition's Team

Provincial elections

Gubernatorial election
Incumbent Teresita Lazaro is running for her third and final term her main opponent is his Vice Governor Edwin Olivarez.

| colspan="5"| Source:

Vice gubernatorial election 
Incumbent Edwin Olivarez is not running for reelection instead he is running for Governor his party nominee is Ramil Hernandez. Hernandez main opponent is Singer Raul Marco Sison.

| colspan="5"| Source:

Provincial Board 
All 4 Districts of Laguna elected Sangguniang Panlalawigan or Provincial Board members.

Summary

1st District 
Cities: Santa Rosa
Municipality: Biñan, San Pedro

| colspan="5"| Source:

2nd District 
Cities: Calamba
Municipality: Bay, Cabuyao, Los Baños

| colspan="6"| Source:

3rd District 
Cities: San Pablo
Municipality: Alaminos, Calauan, Liliw, Nagcarlan, Rizal, Victoria

| colspan="6"| Source:

4th District 
Municipalities: Cavinti, Famy, Kalayaan, Luisiana, Lumban, Mabitac, Magdalena, Majayjay, Paete, Pagsanjan, Pakil, Pangil, Pila, Santa Cruz, Santa Maria, Siniloan

| colspan="5"| Source:

Congressional elections 
Each of Laguna's four legislative districts elected a representative to the House of Representatives. The candidate with the highest number of votes wins the seat.

1st District 
Incumbent Uliran Tee–Joaquin is term-limited and she is running for Mayor of San Pedro her party did not name a candidate for representative but her son Nereo Raymundo Jr. is running but later lost to Dan Fernandez.

| colspan="5"| Source:

2nd District 
Incumbent Justine Marc Chipeco is running for reelection his main opponent is incumbent Provincial Board Member Susano Tapia.

| colspan="5"| Source:

3rd District 
Incumbent Danton Bueser is term limited his party nominee is Ma. Evita Arago.

| colspan="5"| Source:

4th District 
Incumbent Benjamin Agarao Jr. is running for reelection his main opponent is Son of former Governor Edgar San Luis.

| colspan="5"| Source:

City and municipal elections 
All municipalities of Laguna. Calamba City, San Pablo City, and Santa Rosa City will also elect mayor and vice-mayor this election. The candidates for mayor and vice mayor with the highest number of votes wins the seat; they are voted separately, therefore, they may be of different parties when elected. Below is the list of mayoralty and vice mayoralty candidates of each cities and municipalities per district.

1st District 
Cities: Santa Rosa
Municipality: Biñan, San Pedro

Santa Rosa 

| colspan="5"| Source: 

| colspan="5"| Source:

Biñan 

| colspan="5"| Source: 

| colspan="5"| Source:

San Pedro 

| colspan="5"| Source: 

| colspan="5"| Source:

2nd District 
Cities: Calamba
Municipality: Bay, Cabuyao, Los Baños

Calamba 

| colspan="5"| Source: 

| colspan="5"| Source:

Bay 

| colspan="5"| Source: 

| colspan="5"| Source:

Cabuyao 

| colspan="5"| Source: 

| colspan="5"| Source:

Los Baños 

| colspan="5"| Source: 

| colspan="5"| Source:

3rd District 
Cities: San Pablo
Municipality: Alaminos, Calauan, Liliw, Nagcarlan, Rizal, Victoria

San Pablo 

| colspan="5"| Source: 

| colspan="5"| Source:

Alaminos 

| colspan="5"| Source: 

| colspan="5"| Source:

Calauan 

| colspan="5"| Source: 

| colspan="5"| Source:

Liliw 

| colspan="5"| Source: 

| colspan="5"| Source:

Nagcarlan 

| colspan="5"| Source: 

| colspan="5"| Source:

Rizal 

| colspan="5"| Source: 

| colspan="5"| Source:

Victoria 

| colspan="5"| Source: 

| colspan="5"| Source:

4th District 
Municipalities: Cavinti, Famy, Kalayaan, Luisiana, Lumban, Mabitac, Magdalena, Majayjay, Paete, Pagsanjan, Pakil, Pangil, Pila, Santa Cruz, Santa Maria, Siniloan

Cavinti 

| colspan="5"| Source: 

| colspan="5"| Source:

Famy 

| colspan="5"| Source: 

| colspan="5"| Source:

Kalayaan 

| colspan="5"| Source: 

| colspan="5"| Source:

Luisiana 

| colspan="5"| Source: 

| colspan="5"| Source:

Lumban 

| colspan="5"| Source: 

| colspan="5"| Source:

Mabitac 

| colspan="5"| Source: 

| colspan="5"| Source:

Magdalena 

| colspan="5"| Source: 

| colspan="5"| Source:

Majayjay 

| colspan="5"| Source: 

| colspan="5"| Source:

Paete 

| colspan="5"| Source: 

| colspan="5"| Source:

Pagsanjan 

| colspan="5"| Source: 

| colspan="5"| Source:

Pakil 

| colspan="5"| Source: 

| colspan="5"| Source:

Pangil 

| colspan="5"| Source: 

| colspan="5"| Source:

Pila 

| colspan="5"| Source: 

| colspan="5"| Source:

Santa Cruz 

| colspan="5"| Source: 

| colspan="5"| Source:

Santa Maria 

| colspan="5"| Source: 

| colspan="5"| Source:

Siniloan 

| colspan="5"| Source: 

| colspan="5"| Source:

Notelist

References 

Politics of Laguna (province)
2007 Philippine local elections
Elections in Laguna (province)
2007 elections in Calabarzon